Scythris aspromontis is a moth of the family Scythrididae. It was described by Jäckh in 1978. It is found in France and Italy.

Etymology
The species is named for the Aspromonte mountains.

References

aspromontis
Moths described in 1978